Good Night, Sleep Tight is a 2012 children's picture book by Mem Fox and illustrated by Judy Horacek. It is about Skinny Doug, a babysitter, who uses some nursery rhymes to help his charges, Bonnie and Ben, to sleep.

Publication history
 2013, USA, Orchard Books 
 2012, Australia, Scholastic Australia

Reception
A Booklist review found it "a fun book that will remind parents to pass along the golden oldies".

Good Night, Sleep Tight has also been reviewed by Kirkus Reviews, Publishers Weekly, School Library Journal, Horn Book Guides, The New York Times, Reading Time, Educating Young Children, Scan, and Children's Book and Media Review.

See also
 Bonnie and Ben Rhyme Again

References

External links

 Library holdings of Good Night, Sleep Tight
 "Show and tell", Fox and Horacek discussing the process behind creating Good Night, Sleep Tight

Australian picture books
2012 children's books
Picture books by Mem Fox
Sleep in fiction